Elisabeth Georgostathis (born 17 October 2001) is an Australian rules footballer who plays for Western Bulldogs in the AFL Women's (AFLW). It was revealed that Georgostathis had signed a contract extension with the club on 16 June 2021, after playing every game possible for the club that season.

Statistics
Statistics are correct to the end of the 2021 season.

|- style=background:#EAEAEA
| scope=row | 2020 ||  || 17
| 6 || 1 || 1 || 35 || 12 || 47 || 5 || 21 || 0.2 || 0.2 || 5.8 || 2.0 || 7.8 || 0.8 || 3.5 || 0
|-
| scope=row | 2021 ||  || 17
| 3 || 1 || 0 || 47 || 39 || 86 || 14 || 40 || 0.1 || 0.0 || 5.2 || 4.3 || 9.6 || 1.6 || 4.4 || 0
|- class=sortbottom
! colspan=3 | Career
! 15 !! 2 !! 1 !! 82 !! 51 !! 133 !! 19 !! 61 !! 0.1 !! 0.1 !! 5.5 !! 3.4 !! 8.9 !! 1.3 !! 4.1 !! 0
|}

References

External links

 

Living people
2001 births
Western Jets players (NAB League Girls)
Western Bulldogs (AFLW) players
Australian rules footballers from Victoria (Australia)
Sportswomen from Victoria (Australia)